Cymothoe beckeri, or Becker's creamy yellow glider, is a butterfly in the family Nymphalidae. It is found in Nigeria, Cameroon, Gabon, the Republic of the Congo, Angola, the Democratic Republic of the Congo, the Central African Republic and Uganda. The habitat consists of forests.

Females mimic toxic day-flying moths, such as Oetroeda planax and Nytemera hesperia. Both sexes feed on fallen fruit.

The larvae feed on Macaranga and Caloncoba species.

Subspecies
Cymothoe beckeri beckeri (Nigeria: south and the Cross River loop, Cameroon, Gabon, Congo, Angola, western Democratic Republic of the Congo)
Cymothoe beckeri theodosia Staudinger, 1890 (eastern Democratic Republic of the Congo, Central African Republic, western Uganda)

References

Butterflies described in 1858
Cymothoe (butterfly)